Winterbourne railway station served the South Gloucestershire village of Winterbourne, England, from 1903 to 1963.

Future 
Improved services on the / axis are called for as part of the Greater Bristol Metro scheme, a rail transport plan which aims to enhance transport capacity in the Bristol area. The Metro scheme was given the go-ahead in July 2012 as part of the City Deal, whereby local councils would be given greater control over money by the government.

References

See also
Rail services in the West of England

Former Great Western Railway stations
Disused railway stations in Bristol, Bath and South Gloucestershire
Railway stations in Great Britain opened in 1903
Railway stations in Great Britain closed in 1961
Civil Parish of Winterbourne